Oscar S. Paulson  (December 12, 1889- ) was an American Lutheran minister who served in the Wisconsin State Senate.

Biography
Paulson was born near Dalton in Otter Tail County, Minnesota. Paulson graduated from Augsburg College and was ordained in the Lutheran ministry, He became a Lutheran pastor in La Crosse, Wisconsin in 1916. In 1930, he became President of the Minneapolis District of the Lutheran Free Church.

Political career
Paulson was a member of the Senate from 1937 to 1940. He was a member of the Wisconsin Progressive Party.

References

1889 births
Year of death missing
People from Otter Tail County, Minnesota
Politicians from La Crosse, Wisconsin
Wisconsin state senators
Wisconsin Progressives (1924)
20th-century American politicians
Religious leaders from Wisconsin
20th-century American Lutheran clergy
Augsburg University alumni
American people of Norwegian descent